Dorcadion arcivagum is a species of beetle in the family Cerambycidae. It was described by Thomson in 1867. It is known from Turkey.

References

arcivagum
Beetles described in 1867